One of Those Nights may refer to:

Music
Albums
One of Those Nights: The Anthology, 2006 greatest hits collection by band UFO

Songs
"One of Those Nights" (Bucks Fizz song), 1981
"One of Those Nights" (Chris Brown song), 2011 song by Chris Brown from his album Fortune
"One of Those Nights" (Juicy J song), 2013
"One of Those Nights" (Tim McGraw song), 2012
"One of Those Nights Tonight", song by American country music artist Lorrie Morgan from her 1997 album Shakin' Things Up
"One of Those Nights" (센척안해), 2018 song by Key featuring Crush from his album Face

See also
One of These Nights (disambiguation)